The March for Life is an annual rally and march against the practice and legality of abortion, held in Washington, D.C. either on or around the anniversary of Roe v. Wade, a decision legalizing abortion nationwide which was issued in 1973 by the United States Supreme Court. The participants in the march have advocated the overturning of Roe v. Wade, which happened at the end of the case Dobbs v. Jackson Women's Health Organization on June 24, 2022. It is a major gathering of the anti-abortion movement in the United States and it is organized by the March for Life Education and Defense Fund.

History

In the 1960s American public opinion on a variety of issues, including sexuality and abortion, changed. It became much more common for people to have sexual intercourse outside of marriage. The rise of out-of-wedlock births, contraception, and abortion became controversial political issues. When the Supreme Court ruled that it was indeed constitutional for a woman to terminate her pregnancy (in the early stages), a vigorous anti-abortion movement was created. The first March for Life, which was founded by Nellie Gray, was held on January 22, 1974, on the West Steps of the Capitol, with organizers claiming 20,000 supporters in attendance. The march was originally intended to be a one-time event, in hopes that the United States Supreme Court would reverse Roe v. Wade immediately a year after its ruling. However, after the first march in 1974, Gray took steps to institute the rally as a yearly event until Roe v. Wade was overturned by incorporating more grassroots anti-abortion activists into the march, which would be officially recognized as a nonprofit organization the same year. Initially, politicians were viewed with suspicion. But as time passed, organizers of the March focused more and more on legislation and started to lobby politicians. However, the movement has become increasingly distant from the Democratic Party, as it has less and less room for anti-abortion voices, and leaned in favor of the Republican Party. For a long time, many anti-abortion Presidents, such as Ronald Reagan and George H.W. Bush, had decided against appearing at the March. This precedent was broken in 2020, when Donald Trump became the first sitting President to attend the event in person.

During the 33rd annual March for Life in 2006, the nomination of Judge Samuel Alito to the Supreme Court caused a major shift for the movement, because of the expectation that Alito would "win Senate approval and join a majority in overturning Roe."

During the 2009 March for Life, the potential passage of the 110th United States Congress of the Freedom of Choice Act—a bill that would "codify Roe v. Wade" by declaring that abortion is a fundamental right, leading to the lifting of many restrictions on abortion—served as a key rallying point.

In the contemporary United States, the anti-abortion movement has clashed with advocates of modern feminism, with anti-abortion activists claiming that abortion is an abuse of human rights. As a result, women who identified as feminists but who also opposed legal abortion were excluded from the 2017 Women's March in the District of Columbia. The movement also attracts gays and lesbians who have fallen out with the mainstream of their identities because they oppose abortion. Both sides of the abortion debate have made use of novel medical advances, especially in neonatalogy and embryology, to justify their positions. In the case of the March for Life, president of the organization Jeanne Mancini asserted the argument that embryos were mere blobs of tissue was no longer feasible.

After the 2019 March, a widely discussed confrontation occurred between a group of March for Life participants and those of the Indigenous Peoples' March.

Due to the COVID-19 pandemic and a security measure following the 2021 storming of the United States Capitol, the 2021 March for Life was moved online by its organizers, and not held in person. Nevertheless, a small group of demonstrators marched their way towards the building of the Supreme Court, the normal endpoint of the event.

In 2022, the March for Life was marked by an upbeat mood because activists felt confident, based on their belief that the 1973 Roe v. Wade ruling would be overturned. Many attendees were young people, including members of Generation Z. On June 24, 2022, the court ruled in Dobbs that the legality of abortion can be chosen by the states, overturning Roe v. Wade. The March for Life returned in 2023, with participants celebrating the demise of the Roe, though they acknowledged that their dream of the end of abortion in the country had not yet become a reality. Various attendees interviewed by the Washington Post disagreed on what they should advocate for next—(paid) parental leave, flexible work hours, religious conversion, making adoption easier, raising more funds for emergency pregnancy centers, or appealing to those who are neither white nor Christian—now that Roe had already been overturned.

Itinerary
The March for Life proceedings begin around noon. They typically consist of a rally at the National Mall near Fourth Street (in 2018, this was near 12th St. NW). It is followed by a march which travels down Constitution Avenue NW, turns right at First Street NE, and then ends on the steps of the Supreme Court of the United States, where another rally is held. Many protesters start the day by delivering roses and lobbying members of Congress.

Attendance

In 1987, it is estimated that 10,000 participated.

In 1995, which is the last year that the National Park Service made an official estimate of attendance, 45,000 attended.

Between 2003 and 2012, the marches drew crowds estimated in the hundreds of thousands. March organizers estimated attendance of 400,000 in 2011. and 650,000 in 2013. As with all large crowd estimates, the generated number of attendees reported differ, with some sources indicating a figure in the tens of thousands to low six figures.

In 2016, the march proceeded despite a blizzard that dropped  of snow in D.C., with tens of thousands of attendees.

Many young people attend the march, including teenagers and college students attend the march each year, typically traveling with Catholic schools, churches, and youth groups. A columnist for The Washington Post estimated that about half of the marchers were under age 30 in 2010.

In 2022 attendance was estimated to be in the tens of thousands. By 2023, The Washington Post noticed that those who attended the March came from diverse religious backgrounds, white Evangelicals, Protestants, Jews, adherents of non-Christian religions, and members of secular groups. A large number of the marchers were of high-school or college age.

Notable speakers

1987
In 1987, then-President Ronald Reagan spoke remotely via telephone, and vowed to help "end this national tragedy." Jesse Helms, then Senator of North Carolina, attended and spoke. He called abortion an "American holocaust".

2003–2009
In 2003, then-President George W. Bush spoke remotely via telephone and thanked participants for their "devotion to such a noble cause". During his telephone addresses, he tended to speak broadly of opposing abortion as opposed to offering any specific efforts being made to overturn the Roe v. Wade decision.

In 2003, speakers included U.S. Representative Chris Smith, Republican of New Jersey, and Randall Terry, the founder of Operation Rescue. In his speech, Terry encouraged the youth in the audience, calling them to "fight for all you're worth."

In 2004, 15 lawmakers (all Republican) spoke. Among the lawmakers who spoke were U.S. Representatives Todd Tiahrt of Kansas and Pat Toomey of Pennsylvania. Tiahrt, who also spoke at the 30th annual march, urged marchers to "help pro-lifers in your state"; Toomey supported these remarks, saying to vote for anti-abortion candidates in order to reclaim the Senate and, in turn, the courts.

In 2006, U.S. Representative Steve Chabot, an Ohio Republican and prominent anti-abortion advocate in the House of Representatives, spoke to the masses on overturning Roe v. Wade. Nellie Gray, the founder of March for Life, also spoke.

In 2009, approximately 20 Congress members spoke, including U.S. Representative F. James Sensenbrenner, Jr., Wisconsin Republican and former chairman of the House Judiciary Committee, and Gray.

2011–2019

In 2011, speakers included House Majority Leader Eric Cantor, House Majority Whip Kevin McCarthy, and several other members of the U.S. Congress, including then-Representative Mike Pence.

In 2013, presenters included U.S. House Speaker John Boehner (via a pre-recorded video address), former senator and candidate for the 2012 Republican Party presidential nomination Rick Santorum, as well as other members of Congress.

In 2016, Republican presidential candidate Carly Fiorina took part in the march.

In 2017, the march included Vice President Mike Pence, Kellyanne Conway, the Presidential Counselor, the Archbishop of New York Cardinal Timothy M. Dolan, anti-abortion activist Abby Johnson, and NFL player Benjamin Watson. Vice President Pence attended and spoke at the march, becoming the first vice president and the then highest-ranking federal official to do so. Pence was also one of the speakers at the 2010 march while serving as representative of Indiana’s 6th congressional district.

In 2018, President Donald Trump addressed the 45th march via satellite from the White House Rose Garden, becoming the first U.S. President to address the rally using this technology. The march was attended by U.S. House Speaker Paul Ryan, Democratic Illinois Representative Dan Lipinski, former NFL center Matt Birk, and former NFL quarterback Tim Tebow's mother Pam.

In 2019, Trump addressed the crowd via satellite and Pence spoke at the event in person. The President said, "I will always defend the first right in our Declaration of Independence: the right to life." Political commentator Ben Shapiro also spoke at the event.

2020–present
On January 24, 2020, incumbent President Trump became the first U.S. president to attend and speak at the March for Life.

In 2022, two current Republican and one former Democratic House members spoke: Chris Smith, Julia Letlow, and Dan Lipinski.

House Majority Leader Steve Scalise and Representative Chris Smith, co-chair of the Congressional Pro-Life Caucus, addressed the crowd at the 2023 March, as did Mississippi Attorney General Lynn Fitch.

Associated events
Various anti-abortion organizations hold events before and after the March. Such events include a Luau for Life at Georgetown University and a candlelight vigil at the Supreme Court. Additionally, independent films with an anti-abortion message have premiered or have been promoted in association with the March, including the Vatican endorsed film Doonby, which was shown at Landmark E Street Cinema during the 2013 march, and 22 Weeks, which premiered at Union Station's Phoenix  Theatre on the eve of the 2009 march.

Anglican events
Anglicans for Life, the anti-abortion apostolate of the Anglican Church in North America, launched the "Mobilizing the Church for Life" conference on the day before the 2016 March for Life. On the following day, the primate of the Anglican Church in North America, Foley Beach, led Anglicans in the March for Life.

Catholic events

In 2009, the apostolic nuncio to the United States, Archbishop Pietro Sambri, read Pope Benedict XVI's message, which told attendants that he was "deeply grateful" for the youths' "outstanding annual witness for the gospel of life". In 2008, the Pope's message thanked attendants for "promoting respect for the dignity and inalienable rights of every human being." In 2011, an event parallel to the Verizon Center event was held at the D.C. Armory; a total of over 27,000 young people attended the events.

In 2013, a Morning Mass and Rally (preceding the March for Life) was added and held at the Patriot Center on the campus of George Mason University, including Arlington Bishop Paul Loverde, Richmond Bishop Francis DiLorenzo and more than 100 other bishops and priests from across the nation.  Life is VERY Good, which began with 350 participants in 2009, gathered in excess of 12,000 between its two events, held before and after the March, in 2013.

Evangelical events

At the 2016 March for Life rally, the Ethics & Religious Liberty Commission, the public policy arm of the Southern Baptist Convention, organized a conference "aimed at increasing the level of engagement in the pro-life cause".

The Taskforce of United Methodists on Abortion and Sexuality, which is a part of the National Pro-Life Religious Council, holds its annual service of worship at the United Methodist Building, and the liturgy held for the 2016 March of Life featured "a sermon by Dr. Thomas C. Oden, General Editor of the Ancient Christian Commentary on Scripture, former Professor of Theology and Ethics at Drew University, and Lifewatch Advisory Board member."

Lutheran events
Before the 2016 March for Life, a Divine Service was celebrated at Immanuel Lutheran Church in Alexandria, Virginia.

Virtual March for Life
In 2010, Americans United for Life launched an online virtual March. Those unable to attend the March for Life in person could create avatars of themselves and take part in a virtual demonstration on a Google Maps version of the National Mall. The first online event attracted approximately 75,000 participants.

The 2021 March for Life was a virtual event due to the ongoing COVID-19 pandemic and security concerns following the 2021 storming of the United States Capitol.

Media's attention
Members of the anti-abortion movement have frequently claimed that the level of media coverage of the annual March for Life is insufficient.

See also

Anti-abortion movement
Christian right
Walk for Life West Coast (San Francisco)
National Sanctity of Human Life Day
March for Life (Paris, France)
March for Life and Family (Warsaw, Poland)
List of protest marches on Washington, D.C.

References

Further reading

External links

March for Life official website
Photos: 34th Annual March for Life 2007 in Washington, DC

1974 establishments in Washington, D.C.
Abortion in the United States
Annual events in Washington, D.C.
Anti-abortion movement
Anti-abortion organizations in the United States
Washington
Protest marches in Washington, D.C.
Recurring events established in 1974